Route 999 is an east–west regional route in the northern Golan Heights, which Israel captured from Syria in the Six-Day War in 1967. For almost its entire length its access is restricted to Israeli army vehicles. It begins from Sion (Hebrew: שיאון, pronounced "see-OWN") adjacent to the community Snir and the village Ghajar, where it splits north from Highway 99. About 2 km after this junction stands an IDF checkpoint. After the checkpoint the road moves in a northeast direction and climbs steeply on Shebaa farms in parallel with the international border between Golan Heights and Lebanon (the Blue Line). The road passes near the Shebaa farms while it passes on its steep course in the Mount Hermon nature reserve. For the entire length of the road, IDF installations are standing, and it ends its length of 29 km with another IDF checkpoint near the lower cable-car of Mount Hermon, where it meets Highway 98.

Next to the road is Mount HaBetarim, on which a place is marked as the location where Abraham's Brit Bein HaBetarim occurred. The road offers views through all of southern Lebanon.

Before the withdrawal of IDF troops from the security zone in southern Lebanon in 2000, civilian transport on Route 999 in coordination with the IDF was permitted. However, after the withdrawal, the road serves only for secure military traffic.

Roads in Israeli-occupied territories